Bibin George (born 29 March 1988) is an Indian actor and scriptwriter known for his works primarily in the Malayalam film industry. Bibin started his journey in the movie industry by co-writing the movie Amar Akbar Anthony (2015) along with Vishnu Unnikrishnan, starring Prithviraj Sukumaran, Jayasurya and Indrajith Sukumaran, which became one of the blockbusters in the industry. It has reached the milestone of being one of the rare movies from Malayalam to reach  crore club in collection records.

He is also a film actor in Malayalam his movies Margamkali (2019), Thirimali (2022), Oru Pazhaya Bomb Kadha (2018) and Oru Yamandan Premakadha (2019). Later, he concentrated in acting along with script-writing and has done hero roles as well as villain in some notable movies in the industry.

Filmography

As actor

As writer

Awards
Asianet Best Scriptwriter Award - Won for the movie Kattappanayile Rithwik Roshan
SIIMA Award for Best Debut Actor - Nominated for the movie Oru Pazhaya Bomb Kadha

Personal life
Bibin George is married to Philomena Greeshma and they have a daughter.

References

Indian male film actors
Living people
Male actors in Malayalam cinema
Malayalam screenwriters
1988 births